KIXO 106.1 FM is a radio station licensed to Sulphur, Oklahoma. The station broadcasts a Christian Contemporary format, through licensee The Love Station, Inc. Started playing The House on October 5, 2018.

References

External links
KIXO's official website

Contemporary Christian radio stations in the United States
Radio stations established in 1980
1980 establishments in Oklahoma
IXO